Fanny Matilda Charlotta Roos (born 2 January 1995) is a Swedish athlete specialising in the shot put. She won a silver medal at the 2021 European Indoor Championships, while setting an outright national record of 19.29 meters in the final. In doing so, Roos made history by becoming the first Swedish woman in 93 years, and the second overall, to medal in a throwing event at the Olympics, World-, or European Championships. The first to do so was Ruth Svedberg, who won a bronze medal in the discus throw at the 1928 Summer Olympics.

Roos represented Sweden at the 2017 and 2019 World Championships, but failed to reach the final on both occasions. She reached 7th place at the 2020 Summer Olympics.

Her personal bests in the event are 19.42 metres outdoors (national record - Chorzów 2022) and 19.29 metres indoors (national record - Torun 2021).

International competitions

References

1995 births
Living people
Swedish female shot putters
Swedish Athletics Championships winners
World Athletics Championships athletes for Sweden
People from Ljungby Municipality
Athletes (track and field) at the 2020 Summer Olympics
Olympic athletes of Sweden
Sportspeople from Kronoberg County
20th-century Swedish women
21st-century Swedish women